Sheinelle Marie Jones (born April 19, 1978) is an American journalist and a news anchor and correspondent for NBC News. She is one of the hosts of the third hour of Today on weekdays.

She is also the host of the educational nature program Wild Child broadcast on The More You Know block on NBC.

Early life and education 
Sheinelle Marie Jones was born April 19, 1978 in Philadelphia, Pennsylvania. Her father is U.S. District Court Judge C. Darnell Jones II. She attended Wichita Brooks Middle Magnet School and Wichita Heights High School, both in Wichita, Kansas, and Northwestern University in Evanston, Illinois.

Career 
Jones' first broadcast job was in Springfield, Illinois for WICS. Before going to work for NBC News, Jones worked at KOKI-TV, the FOX affiliate in Tulsa, Oklahoma and WTXF-TV, the FOX O&O in Philadelphia.  She was at the Philadelphia station for more than nine years.

Jones joined Today on October 4, 2014 as part of Weekend Today. In January 2019, she became a co-host on 3rd Hour Today. As a co-host on 3rd Hour Today and a co-anchor on the Saturday editions of Weekend Today, Jones was working six days a week. On December 21, 2019, Jones left Weekend Today. In February 2020, Jones had surgery to remove lesions from her vocal cord and thus could not speak at all for two weeks; she remained out of work for six weeks.

Personal life
Jones married Uche Ojeh in 2007 and they have three children, sons Kayin, Uche, and daughter Clara.

References

External links
 

NBC. New. Personalities.  Autorhoryty. Control.  

1978 births
Living people
American women journalists
African-American journalists
MSNBC people
NBC News people
Television personalities from Philadelphia
People from Wichita, Kansas
Medill School of Journalism alumni
21st-century American journalists
African-American women journalists
21st-century American women